King of the Castle is a British children's television fantasy drama serial made by HTV for ITV in 1977.

Written by Bob Baker and Dave Martin, the series is a surreal tale centred on a lonely young boy, Roland Wright, who lives unhappily in a council flat with his father Ron and stepmother June. Escaping from a gang of local bullies in a malfunctioning lift, Roland finds himself transported to a strange fantasy environment where people and places are twisted variations of those he sees in his real life.

Philip Da Costa starred as Roland, while other prominent roles were played by Talfryn Thomas, Fulton Mackay, Milton Johns and Angela Richards.

Episode guide
 TX: 8 May 1977 (17:45) - Roland Wright has just moved into a new block of flats which has a broken lift and a dangerous staircase. Being bright and intelligent, he is a natural victim for the Ripper, leader of the gang who haunts the stairways...
 TX: 15 May 1977 (17:45) - Roland wakes up to find himself in the strange world of the Castle, where he meets Vein, the keeper of the keys.
 TX: 22 May 1977 (17:45) - Fleeing from Hawkspur and Ergon, Roland is confronted by the Warrior. Narrowly escaping, he meets the Lady - a glamorous, self-styled clairvoyant.
 TX: 29 May 1977 (17:45) - Roland is captured by a castle guard and sent to the kitchens as a skivvy. He plans to escape, but is betrayed and trapped in the Castle.
 TX: 5 June 1977 (17:00) - Roland attempts to argue his case in front of the Lord, and after some difficulty, he gets through the ante-chamber to face the Warrior...
 TX: 12 June 1977 (17:00) - Roland decides to make numerous changes before he escapes, but everyone is plotting against him...
 TX: 19 June 1977 (17:00) - Roland is put on trial, where all the witnesses are hostile. Then he meets his old enemy, Ripper, for a final confrontation.

 Episodes 1 and 2 directed by Peter Hammond, Episodes 3, 5 & 7 directed by Terry Harding, Episodes 4 & 6 directed by Leonard White.
 Episodes were 30 minutes in duration, including advertisements.
 For the sword fight between Roland and the Warrior in Episode 5, John V. Clarke of the British Kendo Association was brought in to act as fight adviser — for which he received an on-screen credit on the closing titles.

DVD release
 The complete series was released by Network DVD exclusively through their online website on 8 June 2009. Since Episode 3 no longer exists in the archives in any format, the version represented on the DVD release is sourced from an off-air VHS videocassette recording.

External links
 
 

1970s British children's television series
1977 British television series debuts
1977 British television series endings
ITV children's television shows
Television series by ITV Studios
English-language television shows
Television shows produced by Harlech Television (HTV)